The Koyna Dam is one of the largest dams in Maharashtra, India. It is a rubble-concrete dam constructed on Koyna River which rises in Mahabaleshwar, a hillstation in Sahyadri ranges. It is located in Koyna Nagar, Satara district, in the Western Ghats on the state highway between Chiplun and Karad.

Details 
The main purpose of the dam is hydroelectricity with some  irrigation in neighboring areas. Due to its electricity generating potential, Koyna river is considered as the 'life line of Maharashtra'.

The spillway of the dam is located at the center. It has 6 radial gates. The dam plays a vital role of flood controlling in monsoon season. It is one of the largest civil engineering projects commissioned after Indian independence. The Koyna hydro-electric project is run by the Maharashtra State Electricity Board.

The dam has withstood many earthquakes in the recent past, including the devastating 1967 Koynanagar earthquake, resulting in the dam developing some cracks. After the disaster grouting of the cracks was done. Also internal holes were drilled to relieve the hydrostatic pressures in the body of the dam. Indian scientific establishment has formulated an ambitious project to drill a deep borehole in the region and intensely study the earthquake activity. This would help in better understanding and possible forecast of earthquakes. The proposal is to drill up to 7 km and study the physical, geological and chemical processes and properties of the reservoir triggered earthquake zone in real time. It would be an international project to be led by Indian scientists.

In 1973 the non-overflow portion of the dam was strengthened, followed by strengthening the spillway section in 2006. Now the dam is expected to be safe against any future earthquake, including ones with a higher intensity than that of 1967.

See also 

 Koyna Hydroelectric Project
 Sahyadri Tiger Reserve
 Koyna Wildlife Sanctuary
 List of power stations in India
 List of conventional hydroelectric power stations

References

External links 
 
 WaterFallKoyna

Dams in Satara district
1964 establishments in Kerala
Dams completed in 1964
Energy infrastructure completed in 1964
Hydroelectric power stations in Maharashtra
Gravity dams
Dams in Western Ghats
20th-century architecture in India